Florence Patricia Alice McLaughlin OBE (née Aldwell; 23 June 1916 – 7 January 1997) was a unionist politician in Northern Ireland and one of the earliest female Members of Parliament (MPs) from the region.

Early life 
McLaughlin was educated at Ashleigh House and Trinity College, Dublin before going on to join the Ulster Unionist Party.

Career 
Chosen to represent the party in the West Belfast constituency for the 1955 general election, she captured the seat from incumbent Jack Beattie and went on to successfully defend it at the 1959 election before retiring from politics. She made a surprise comeback in the 1970 general election as the Conservative Party candidate in Wandsworth Central, although she failed to win the seat. She was also a founding member of the Westminster women's Orange Lodge.

On 13 January 1958 she visited Crumlin Road Prison in Belfast where Irish Republican Army (IRA) inmate Eamonn Boyce noted in Irish in his diary entry from that date that she was inside 'looking at the animals!'.

Awards 
She was awarded the OBE in 1965.

References

External links 

1916 births
1997 deaths
Members of the Parliament of the United Kingdom for Belfast constituencies (since 1922)
UK MPs 1955–1959
UK MPs 1959–1964
Alumni of Trinity College Dublin
Conservative Party (UK) parliamentary candidates
Ulster Unionist Party members of the House of Commons of the United Kingdom
Female members of the Parliament of the United Kingdom for Northern Irish constituencies
Officers of the Order of the British Empire
20th-century women politicians from Northern Ireland